Felipe Batista Pinto or simply Batista (born April 26, 1987 in São João Del Rey), is a Brazilian footballer, who currently plays for Corinthians Alagoano.

Career
The defensive midfielder made his professional debut for Atlético Mineiro in the 1-2 home defeat to Palmeiras in the Campeonato Brasileiro on August 12, 2007. He had come on as an 82nd-minute substitute for Coelho.

Contract
Atlético Mineiro 1 March 2006 to 31 December 2010

Notes

External links
 sambafoot
 zerozero
 placar

1987 births
Living people
Brazilian footballers
Clube Atlético Mineiro players
Clube de Regatas Brasil players
Association football midfielders